Saint William's Academy is an institution of secondary learning located at the city of Tabuk in the province of Kalinga, Philippines. The school currently has a total of 1300+ students and employs a faculty number of 31 and staff of about seven and 25 classrooms. As of the year of 2014, the school is preparing for its 50th anniversary on 2018. The school is making its numerous projects into action some of which are the construction of another classroom building to be erected between the canteen and the guard house and the construction of the school's second gymnasium at the back of the special section building.

Brief history 

Through the request of the various religious organizations, a first year high school was started out in Barangay Bulanao as an annex to Saint Theresita’s School Tabuk during the school year 1965-1966. In the absence of a school building, the students were temporarily housed at Bulanao Catholic Chapel which was then used as a classroom on weekdays and a house of worship on Sundays.

The following school year, 1966-1967, first and second year education was offered but still St. William’s remained as an annex of Saint Theresita’s School Tabuk. A movable partition was put up in the chapel so that it could accommodate the first and the second years. It was during this school year when a four-room building was constructed in preparation for the incoming school year. Meanwhile, negotiations were being made with the Department of Education for the release of a permit to offer first to third year education and at the same time for the school to stand as an independent school.

On June 27, 1967, permit no.262 s. 1967 was finally released by the Department of Education for the school to operate first to third year high school education, under a registered name, SAINT WILLIAM’S ACADEMY	 (named after Msgr. William Brasseur, the Apostolic Vicar of the Mountain Provinces). Thus, Saint William’s Academy was born with Fr. Andres Nowe as the first director and with Mr. Guido Mangawit as the first principal.

During the school year 1967-1968, another five room building was constructed. The following school year, 1968-1969, the high school now operates its four-year levels fully packed with students, under permit no. 214 s. 1968, and Government Recognition No. 236 s. 1968 both of which were issued on July 3, 1968. The college department, which was housed in the newly constructed buildings in the high school campus started out with the first year of their course offering. The whole year was marked with many memorable activities for the two departments staying together. The high school graduated its first 63 graduates by the end of the school year. Extension classrooms were made during the summer time to accommodate the projected increase in enrollment the following year.

During the school year 1969-1970, enrollment soared high beyond expectation. Remedy has to be done to accommodate the large number of students. The college then has to move to its new building though it was not yet fully finished to give way for the high school department. In the school year 1970-1971, Fr. Miguel Veys took over as the third director of the high school department in place of Fr. Paul Van Hoverbeke. As Fr. Miguel Veys got older, in 1975, Fr. Mike Haelterman was assigned as an assistant parish priest and as the new director of the school. In one year time, the new St. William’s Parish church was erected, which was oftentimes, was also used for graduation ceremonies of both the college and high school department.

In 1977, Mr. Guido Mangawit, still the high school principal, was appointed Dean of Studies in the college. His new position paved way for the appointment of Mr. Mauricio Pangda as the new high school principal. In 1978, the Saint William’s Gymnasium began construction by Fr. Mike at the school campus. Immediately after that, it was followed by the relocation of the high school building no.1 to the western wing of the campus to make the compound wider and to give way for the construction of two more classrooms to accommodate the increasing high school population. Indeed, Fr. Mike’s stewardship for Saint William’s was marked by the physical expansion of the school. He took care of both the high school and college department ‘til the school year 1989-1990. By October 1990, Fr. Eugene Van Ackere assumed the directorship of the two departments. His immediate concern was to build another five classrooms at the end of the school year in order to remedy the overcrowded classrooms and the continuing increase in population.

Mr. Mauricio Pangda continued his administration of the high school until 2006 when Mrs. Paz Pinera took over his position for retirement sake. Mrs. Pinera’s administration lasted for three years. Fr. Sean Mejia, JCL immediately replaced her July 2009 when she decided to retire to give more time to her family. In the school year 2011-2012, Sr. Emeteria Poda-an, SIHM, formerly the school’s assistant to the principal, replaced the latter as the school principal when Fr. Sean was assigned as the AVT schools superintendent.

Schools in Kalinga (province)